Walter William Seitz (14 July 1927 – 26 September 1997) was an Australian rules footballer who played with Richmond in the Victorian Football League (VFL).

Notes

External links 

Wally Seitz's playing statistics from The VFA Project

1927 births
1997 deaths
Australian rules footballers from Victoria (Australia)
Richmond Football Club players
Yarraville Football Club players